Llanharry is a village, community (civil parish) and electoral ward in the county borough of Rhondda Cynon Taf, Wales.

Historically part of Glamorgan, Llanharry has been inextricably linked with iron mining as far back as the Roman period, and for a period in the 20th century it boasted the only iron mine in Wales.

The town is infamous for being the site of the murders of Harry and Megan Tooze, which remain some of Wales' most notorious unsolved murders.

Employment

Llanharry iron mine worked from the early 1900s but closed in 1976; its main ore was goethite, which was used at the local ironworks.

Since the closure of its mines and ironworks, Llanharry has been in economic decline, as are most South Wales Valleys villages once dependent on heavy industry. Llanharry's proximity to the M4 motorway in Wales has allowed its residents opportunities to commute to work more easily rather than seeking work locally.

Llanharry contains a few small local amenities, such as a corner shop and a hairdressers.

Education
Llanharry is home to Llanharry Primary School, built 1935 and Ysgol Gyfun Llanhari Welsh medium secondary school which was built in 1974.  In 2012 the secondary school became Rhondda Cynon Taf's first 3-19 school, opening a new Welsh language primary department in the former sixth form block.

Transportation 
Buses are the main transportation links servicing Llanharry. Between 1871 and 1951, the village was served by Llanharry railway station, but there is no longer any local rail connection. The nearest station is now Pontyclun. The M4 motorway skirts the southern end of the village, but there is no direct local access to it.

Social life 
At the centre of Llanharry is Saint Illtud's Church which was built in 1867.

There is presently only one public houses in Llanharry; the Fox & Hounds, The Bear Inn is no longer open.  Llanharry also has its own working men's club.

Llanharry is home to Llanharry AFC, a football team who compete in the Bridgend & District Premier Division. The team play in yellow shirts with black shorts & socks, and play their home games at The Recreation Ground in Llanharry.

Regeneration schemes 
Llanharry benefits from the Llanharry Action for Change Project which uses funds, including money from the European Union, to support projects and improvements in the village.

Local politics 
In terms of local politics Llanharry Community Council is responsible for representing the views of local people. To fund its activities, the Council receives a proportion of the council tax collected each year from every home in the village, depending on rateable value.

The Llanharry electoral ward is coterminous with the borders of the community and elects a county councillor to Rhondda Cynon Taf County Borough Council. Since 1995 the ward has been represented by either the Labour Party or Plaid Cymru, In the 2012 elections Labour Councillor Barry Stephens JP won the seat from Plaid Cymru and was elected Borough Councillor for Llanharry and Tylagarw. During his time in office he made many improvements to the previously neglected area including refurbishing and improving the main shopping area by adding paved areas with gardens and benches. He also put in a much needed path to The cemetery as previously residents had to walk in the road to get there. He was subsequently elected Mayor of Rhondda Cynon Taff 2015/2016. 
In the 2017 election Wayne Owen of the Boars Head Tylagarw won the seat as an Independent candidate.  County Borough Council Elections 2017, Rhondda Cynon Taf County Borough Council. Retrieved 27 October 2018.

References

External links
 Llanharry Community Council
 Heritage Trail:Llanharry
 South Wales Amateur Football League
 Llanharry AFC
 Llanharry Amateur Football Club

Wards of Rhondda Cynon Taf
Villages in Rhondda Cynon Taf
Communities in Rhondda Cynon Taf